The United States Bicycle Route System (abbreviated USBRS) is the national cycling route network of the United States. It consists of interstate long-distance cycling routes that use multiple types of bicycling infrastructure, including off-road paths, bicycle lanes, and low-traffic roads. As with the complementary United States Numbered Highways system for motorists, each U.S. Bicycle Route is maintained by state and local governments. The USBRS is intended to eventually traverse the entire country, like the Dutch National Cycle Routes and the United Kingdom's National Cycle Network, yet at a scale similar to the EuroVelo network that spans Europe.

The USBRS was established in 1978 by the American Association of State Highway and Transportation Officials (AASHTO), the same body that coordinates the numbering of Interstate highways and U.S. Routes. The first two U.S. Bicycle Routes were established in 1982 and remained the only two until 2011. Steady growth and interest in the system has followed since.

Layout
Like United States Numbered Highways and many national routing systems, the U.S. Bicycle Route system is designed to roughly follow a grid. Mainline routes are the major cross-country routes and are represented with one- or two-digit numbers. Even-numbered routes are planned to primarily run east–west, with low-numbered routes in the north and high-numbered routes in the south. Odd-numbered routes will primarily run north–south, with low-numbered routes starting in the east and ascending in number toward the west. Three-digit numbers are assigned to auxiliary routes, with the last two digits denoting the parent that the auxiliary connects to. Much like other routing systems, the grid is sometimes violated; for example, U.S. Bicycle Route 76 (USBR 76) is projected to turn to the north in Colorado and end in Oregon as opposed to California, south of (and temporarily concurrent with) USBR 20 but far north of USBR 50. As with auxiliary Interstate Highways, two distinct U.S. Bicycle Routes in two different states along the same mainline route may share the same three-digit number without any plan to connect the routes. The first example of this repetition occurred in 2021 with the approval of USBR 230 in Ohio, which is not intended to connect to an existing USBR 230 in Wisconsin.

The existing USBR 1 will be the easternmost route, though USBR 5 will run farther east of it in Virginia and the Carolinas. The westernmost and northernmost routes are USBR 97 and USBR 8, respectively, both of which are in the state of Alaska, but USBR 97 also enters Washington. Outside of Alaska, the westernmost route is expected to be USBR 95 and the northernmost USBR 8. USBR 90 is expected to be the southernmost route. Despite the analogy the system has to the U.S. Highway system, the USBRS's route numbers do not necessarily trace the same route as the corresponding U.S. Highway number; for example, while USBR 1 will run close to the East Coast and thus parallel U.S. Route 1 (US 1), the projected route of USBR 10 generally follows US 2.

In order for a route to qualify as a U.S. Bike Route, it needs to connect two or more states, connect multiple U.S. Bike Routes, or connect a U.S. Bike Route with a national border.

History
The USBRS was established in 1978 by AASHTO for the purpose of "facilitat[ing] travel between the states over routes which have been identified as being more suitable than others for cycling."

The first routes were defined in 1982: U.S. Bicycle Route 1 (USBR 1) from North Carolina to Virginia, and the stretch of USBR 76 from Illinois through Kentucky to Virginia. These two routes remained the only routes in the system until 2011. In the interim, only minor routing changes had been made in Virginia.

AASHTO established a new task force in 2003 to study expansion of the system. The task force included state and federal highway officials and representatives from bicycling organizations. In October 2008, AASHTO approved a national-level corridor and route designation plan. Other organizations involved in the effort include state departments of transportation, the Federal Highway Administration (FHWA), and the Adventure Cycling Association.

In 2009, the U.S. House of Representatives proposed moving the U.S. Bicycle Route System under the authority of the FHWA as part of a new Office of Livability. In 2009, the FHWA published a new edition of the Manual on Uniform Traffic Control Devices that introduces a revised U.S. Bicycle Route shield. Compared to the 2003 edition, the new design swaps the bicycle symbol and route number.

In early May 2011, the first major expansion of the system was made. Five new parent routes, two child routes, and one alternate route were created, along with modifications to the existing routes in Virginia and the establishment of USBR 1 in New England.
 U.S. Bicycle Route 1 now has an additional run from the state of Maine to New Hampshire.
 U.S. Bicycle Route 1A is a sea-side alternate route for USBR 1 in Maine.
 U.S. Bicycle Route 8 runs from Fairbanks, Alaska, along the Alaska Highway, to the Canadian border.
 U.S. Bicycle Route 108 runs from its parent route in Tok, Alaska, to Anchorage.
 U.S. Bicycle Route 208 follows the Haines Highway from the Alaska Marine Highway terminal in Haines to the Canadian border.
 U.S. Bicycle Route 20 runs from the St. Clair River through the state of Michigan to Lake Michigan.
 U.S. Bicycle Route 87 follows the Klondike Highway from the Alaska Marine Highway terminal in Skagway to the Canadian border.
 U.S. Bicycle Route 95 follows the Richardson Highway from Delta Junction, Alaska to the Alaska Marine Highway terminal in Valdez.
 U.S. Bicycle Route 97 is entirely within Alaska, and it runs from Fairbanks, through Anchorage, to Seward.

In 2012, the FHWA approved the use of an alternative U.S. Bicycle Route marker design on an interim basis. The alternative design departs from the longstanding "acorn" shape in favor of a Reuleaux triangle placed over a green background. , the FHWA has given 13 states interim approval to use the alternative design.

Across 2013, several other additions to the system were made.  After approval in 2012, signage for USBR 45 in Minnesota was completed in the summer. An expansion of USBR 76 into Missouri was signed in October, and both Tennessee and Maryland entered the system on November 5 with USBR 23 and USBR 50, respectively.  Florida has also begun planning on four bicycle routes, including its stretch of USBR 1 and USBR 90.

List of routes

, there are 31 official parent routes in varying stages of completion. In areas where a specific route has not been approved by AASHTO, there is only a prioritized corridor. The 24 existing subsidiary and alternate routes are grouped with their one- or two-digit parents. Approved or signposted routes are located in the District of Columbia and 33 states: Alaska, Arizona, California, Connecticut, Delaware, Florida, Georgia, Kentucky, Idaho, Illinois, Indiana, Kansas, Maine, Maryland, Massachusetts, Michigan, Minnesota, Missouri, Nevada, New Hampshire, New York, North Carolina, North Dakota, Ohio, Oklahoma, Pennsylvania, Tennessee, Utah, Vermont, Virginia, Washington, Wisconsin, and West Virginia. Ohio has the most of any state, with eight active routes total.

List of prioritized corridors
Below is an incomplete list of prioritized corridors, "50-mile-wide areas where a route may be developed":

See also

 TransAmerica Bicycle Trail
 TransCanada Trail
 Adventure Cycling Route Network
 EuroVelo
 Numbered-node cycle network, a contrasting international system that encourages users to take arbitrary routes

U.S. state bicycle route systems:
 List of BicyclePA bicycle routes
 Delaware Bicycle Route 1
 List of bicycle routes in North Carolina
 List of Georgia State Bicycle Routes
 List of New York State Bicycle Routes

References

External links

 U.S. Bicycle Route System - Adventure Cycling Association
 The United States Bicycle Route System: Corridor Plan - Adventure Cycling Association

 
Types of roads
National cycling route networks